Denis Kurepanov (born March 30, 1988) is a Russian professional ice hockey forward currently playing for Diables Rouges de Briançon of the Ligue Magnus.

Kurepanov made his Kontinental Hockey League debut playing with Metallurg Novokuznetsk during the 2011–12 KHL season. Kurepanov played 149 games in the KHL over four seasons with Novokuznetsk before he was released from his contract on June 23, 2015.

References

External links

1988 births
Living people
Ariada Volzhsk players
Krylya Sovetov Moscow players
Metallurg Novokuznetsk players
Neftyanik Almetyevsk players
Russian ice hockey forwards
Sportspeople from Barnaul
Sputnik Nizhny Tagil players
Tolpar Ufa players
Toros Neftekamsk players
Tsen Tou Jilin City players
Yermak Angarsk players
Yuzhny Ural Orsk players
Zauralie Kurgan players